Afruz Amighi  (born 1974) is an Iranian-born American sculptor and installation artist. Her work has been exhibited in the United States, London and in the Middle East. She is based in Brooklyn, New York.

Early life
Amighi was born in 1974 in Tehran, Iran, to a Jewish American mother and a Zoroastrian Iranian father. She was raised in New York City. Amighi graduated from Barnard College with a B.A. degree in 1997 in political science; before completing an M.F.A. degree in 2007 at New York University.

Career
In 2009, she was awarded the Jameel Prize for Middle Eastern contemporary art by the Victoria and Albert Museum in London. In 2011, she received the fellowship in sculpture by the New York Foundation for the Arts. 

In 2013, her work was exhibited at the 55th Venice Biennale. Amighi's art is in the collections of the Metropolitan Museum of Art, the Houston Museum of Fine Art, the Victoria and Albert Museum, The Newark Museum of Art, and the Devi Foundation, and others. In 2017, a series of Amighi's feminist sculptures were presented at the Sophia Contemporary Gallery, London. In 2018, the Frist Art Museum in Nashville, presented her first one-person museum exhibition.

She served as artist-in-residence in partnership with the Intersections program at the Department of Art and Art History at the University of Hawai’i at Manoa.

See also 

 List of Iranian women artists

References

Living people
1974 births
Iranian sculptors
Iranian installation artists
Iranian women artists
Iranian emigrants to the United States
Barnard College alumni
New York University alumni
American people of Iranian descent
American artists of Iranian descent